Paramount Stations Group (sometimes abbreviated as PSG) was a company that controlled a group of American broadcast television stations. The company existed from 1991 until 2001.

History
Paramount Communications, the then-parent company of Paramount Pictures, formed the Paramount Stations Group in 1991 after buying out the remaining stake in TVX Broadcast Group that it did not already own. At the time of the transition in 1991, the group consisted of six outlets: Fox affiliates KRRT (now KMYS) in the San Antonio area, WLFL-TV in Raleigh, and WTXF-TV in Philadelphia; and independent stations KTXA in Fort Worth, KTXH in Houston, and WDCA in Washington, D.C. Shortly thereafter, the group began its expansion with its purchase of then-Fox affiliate WKBD-TV in Detroit from Cox Enterprises in 1993.

The original incarnation of Viacom purchased Paramount in 1993, with the deal closing in March 1994; Viacom's existing group of CBS- and NBC-affiliated stations continued to be run separately from the Paramount stations until December 1995, when they were folded into PSG. Viacom also included its part-time LMA with WVIT, that of WTXX. Shortly afterward Viacom entered into a joint venture with Chris-Craft Industries, which owned several television stations as part of its United Television subsidiary, to launch the United Paramount Network (UPN). Four of PSG's original six stations, along with several acquisitions such as WSBK-TV in Boston, and WTXX in Waterbury, which Viacom operated through a LMA with WVIT, became charter affiliates of the network when UPN launched in January 1995.

PSG sold off three of its original six stations as well; WLFL, KRRT and WTXF were sold to other companies, with the latter becoming a Fox-owned station. To make up for the loss of its Philadelphia-owned station, PSG bought Philadelphia independent station WGBS-TV and renamed it to WPSG-TV, and moved the UPN affiliation there. The company eventually divested itself of the CBS and NBC stations it held and purchased more UPN affiliates as the 1990s continued.

Airing since 1992 in Sweden and other European countries, 4 of the group's independent stations began in late December 1993 testing Video Games Challenge, interactive via the phone game show produced by Invisible Cities of Los Angeles and Big Band Productions of Sweden. In February 2000, Paramount Stations Group and ACME Communications reached an agreement.

In 2000, PSG bought out Chris-Craft's stake in UPN. Shortly thereafter, Chris-Craft exited broadcasting and sold most of its stations to News Corporation's Fox Television Stations unit.

PSG was folded the next year after Viacom completed its merger with CBS. The remaining PSG stations were merged with the CBS owned-and-operated stations to form the Viacom Television Stations Group. Today, that group is called the CBS Television Stations Group.

Stations 
Stations are arranged alphabetically by state and by community of license.

Notes

References 

Defunct television broadcasting companies of the United States
Paramount Pictures
UPN
Paramount Global subsidiaries
American companies established in 1991
Mass media companies established in 1991
Mass media companies disestablished in 2001